Xincheng Subdistrict may refer to the following locations in the People's Republic of China:

新城街道

Anhui
Xincheng Subdistrict, Huangshan, in Huangshan District, Huangshan City, Anhui

Gansu
Xincheng Subdistrict, Jiuquan, in Suzhou District, Jiuquan, Gansu

Heilongjiang
Xincheng Subdistrict, Xiangfang, in Xiangfang District, Harbin, Heilongjiang

Henan
Xincheng Subdistrict, Jiaozuo, in Shanyang District, Jiaozuo, Henan
Xincheng Subdistrict, Shangqiu, in Suiyang District, Shangqiu, Henan
Xincheng Subdistrict, Zhengzhou, in Huiji District, Zhengzhou, Henan

Hunan
Xincheng Subdistrict, Longshan County, in Longshan County, Hunan

Inner Mongolia
Xincheng Subdistrict, Arxan, in Arxan, Inner Mongolia
Xincheng Subdistrict, Ergun, in Ergun, Inner Mongolia

Jiangsu
Xincheng Subdistrict, Yancheng, in Tinghu District, Yancheng, Jiangsu

Liaoning
Xincheng Subdistrict, Donggang, Liaoning, in Donggang, Liaoning
Xincheng Subdistrict, Kaiyuan, Liaoning, in Kaiyuan, Liaoning
Xincheng Subdistrict, Xinmin, in Xinmin, Liaoning

Shaanxi
Xincheng Subdistrict, Ankang, in Hanbin District, Ankang, Shaanxi
Xincheng Subdistrict, Hancheng, in Hancheng, Shaanxi

Shandong
Xincheng Subdistrict, Dong'e County, in Dong'e County, Shandong
Xincheng Subdistrict, Feicheng, in Feicheng, Shandong
Xincheng Subdistrict, Weifang, in Kuiwen District, Weifang, Shandong

Shanxi
Xincheng Subdistrict, Taiyuan, in Jiancaoping District, Taiyuan, Shanxi

Xinjiang
Xincheng Subdistrict, Aksu, Xinjiang, in Aksu, Xinjiang
Xincheng Subdistrict, Korla, in Korla, Xinjiang 
Xincheng Subdistrict, Shihezi, in Shihezi, Xinjiang
Xincheng Subdistrict, Tacheng, in Tacheng, Xinjiang

Zhejiang
Xincheng Subdistrict, Jiaxing, in Xiuzhou District, Jiaxing, Zhejiang

Other written forms
Xincheng Subdistrict, Harbin (新成街道), in Xiangfang District, Harbin, Heilongjiang
Xincheng Subdistrict, Rui'an (莘塍街道), in Rui'an, Zhejiang